Tolo is a surname. Notable people with the surname include:

Marianna Tolo (born 1989), Australian basketball player
Marilù Tolo (born 1944), Italian film actress
Nouhou Tolo (born 1997), Cameroonian football player

See also

Tola (name)
Tolos
Tono (name)
Toso (surname)